The NWA New Zealand Heavyweight Championship is the primary singles title in the NWA-affiliated wrestling promotion NWA New Zealand. It is the first heavyweight championship in New Zealand and one of the oldest in the world. It was first won by Gisborne Katene, who defeated Frank Findlay in 1919. The title has generally been defended in New Zealand, most often in Christchurch, Tauranga, Wellington and Auckland, New Zealand.

Title history

References 

National Wrestling Alliance championships
Heavyweight wrestling championships
National professional wrestling championships
Professional wrestling in New Zealand